The Kayaba Ku-4 was a research aircraft built in Japan in 1940 to investigate the possibilities of tailless aircraft designs. It followed designer Hidemasa Kimura's successful Ku-2 and Ku-3 designs for the Imperial Japanese Army. While these previous aircraft had been gliders, however, the Ku-4 was to be a powered by a pusher engine. It had a low, swept wing, and like the Ku-2, fins at the wingtips.

Work on the prototype was well advanced by April 1941, but the following month, Kimura's relationship with the Army soured following the crash of the Ku-2. The Ku-4 was cancelled, and Kimura eventually received only ¥17,000 of the ¥200,000 that had been promised for the development of his tailless designs.

Specifications (as designed)

References

 
 日本飞翼的短暂研究

1940s Japanese experimental aircraft
Tailless aircraft
Kayaba aircraft